Gary Woodland (born May 21, 1984) is an American professional golfer who plays on the PGA Tour.  Woodland won the U.S. Open in 2019, his first major championship and sixth professional victory.  Following a successful college career, he turned pro in 2007 and briefly competed on the circuit then known as the Nationwide Tour, now the Korn Ferry Tour. Woodland has competed on the PGA Tour since 2009 and has four wins.

Early life
Woodland was born in Topeka, Kansas, the son of Dan and Linda Woodland. He attended Shawnee Heights High School in the suburb of Tecumseh. After high school, he attended Washburn University in Topeka on a basketball scholarship, but left after his freshman year to attend the University of Kansas in Lawrence on a golf scholarship. He studied sociology while at KU. Woodland had a successful college golf career, winning four tournaments before turning professional in 2007.

Professional career
After turning professional, Woodland played in a handful of tournaments on the Nationwide Tour in 2007 and 2008. At the end of the 2008 season, he entered the Qualifying school for the PGA Tour, and finished in a tie for 11th, which was good enough to earn him a full card to play on the PGA Tour in 2009. However, he struggled for form in his debut season, making just eight cuts in 18 appearances before a shoulder injury cut his golfing year short in July.

In 2010, Woodland divided his time between the PGA and Nationwide Tours. He continued to struggle for his best form but did not record a single top ten finish on either tour. He did display enough consistency to finish 92nd in the Nationwide Tour money list. Once again, he entered the season-ending qualifying school, and again he finished T-11, to secure a return to full PGA Tour status.

Woodland's second tournament of 2011 was the Bob Hope Classic, where he and Jhonattan Vegas finished tied for first place at 27-under-par; Vegas edged out Woodland in a playoff for the title. This was his first top-10 finish on either of the two main tours.

In March 2011, Woodland won his first PGA Tour title at the Transitions Championship by one stroke when fellow American Webb Simpson missed a par putt on the final hole. Just a few moments earlier Woodland had scrambled a fantastic par from the same position as Simpson on the last, after hitting his second shot over the back of the green. This win secured Woodland a place at the 2011 Masters Tournament and also elevated him to what was then a career high 53rd in the Official World Golf Ranking. He later earned an invitation into the U.S. Open after moving into the Top 50. He left the tournament with an OWGR ranking of 39th. In November 2011, he won the Omega Mission Hills World Cup with Matt Kuchar. He finished 2011 ranked 17th on the PGA Tour money list and 51st in the OWGR. He had ended 2009 ranked 962 and 2010 591.

Woodland reached the final of the 2015 WGC-Cadillac Match Play, where he lost to Rory McIlroy, and moved to a career-best 32nd in the OWGR.

In February 2018, Woodland won his third PGA Tour event, at the Waste Management Phoenix Open in a sudden-death playoff over Chez Reavie. After finishing tied at 18 under, Woodland won with a par on the first extra hole to end a five-year drought on tour. Woodland moved up to fifth in the season's FedEx Cup standings.

Woodland held the 36-hole lead at the PGA Championship in 2018 with a total 130, which was a tournament record through the first two rounds. He led by a stroke over Kevin Kisner at the halfway stage. He started the final round at nine under par, three shots behind leader Brooks Koepka. He finished in a tie for sixth with a score of 10 under par, six strokes behind the winner Koepka.

In January 2019, Woodland held the lead entering the final round at the winners-only Sentry Tournament of Champions at Kapalua Resort in Maui, Hawaii. He shot a five-under-par 68 but still lost to champion Xander Schauffele who shot a course record-tying 62.

In February 2019, Woodland invited Amy Bockerstette, a collegiate golfer with Down syndrome, to play the par-3 16th hole at TPC Scottsdale during a Tuesday practice round at the Waste Management Phoenix Open. After hitting her tee shot into a greenside bunker, Bockerstette surprised Woodland by parring the hole in front of a roaring crowd. The PGA Tour's video capturing the moment went viral, receiving 43 million views across various social media platforms.

At the U.S. Open in June 2019, Woodland held the 54-hole lead at Pebble Beach Golf Links. On Sunday, he shot a 2-under-par 69 for 271 (−13), which gave him a three-shot margin over the runner-up, two-time defending champion Koepka. Woodland became the fourth champion in U.S. Open history who was double-digits under-par. The victory was his first major and his sixth professional win. In his previous thirty starts in majors, Woodland had only carded two top-ten finishes, both in the PGA Championship (2018, 2019). The win at the U.S. Open moved him from 25th to 12th in the Official World Golf Ranking. At the post-win press conference, Woodland FaceTimed Bockerstette live, telling her "I used your positive energy." Two days later, Woodland joined Bockerstette with a surprise appearance on The Today Show where, pointing to the U.S. Open trophy in Bockerstette's hands, he told her "We won this together."

In December 2019, Woodland played on the U.S. team at the 2019 Presidents Cup at Royal Melbourne Golf Club in Australia. The U.S. team won 16–14. Woodland went 1–2–1 and lost his Sunday singles match against Im Sung-jae.

Amateur wins
2005 (2) Cleveland State Invitational, Kansas Amateur
2006 (1) Kansas Invitational
2007 (3) All-American Golf Classic, Louisiana Classics, Kansas Amateur

Professional wins (6)

PGA Tour wins (4)

PGA Tour playoff record (1–2)

Adams Pro Tour wins (1)
2008 Southwest Kansas Pro-Am

Other wins (1)

Major championships

Wins (1)

Results timeline
Results not in chronological order in 2020.

CUT = missed the half-way cut
WD = withdrew
"T" indicates a tie for a place
NT = No tournament due to COVID-19 pandemic

Summary

Most consecutive cuts made – 6 (twice)
Longest streak of top-10s – 2 (2019 PGA – 2019 U.S. Open)

Results in The Players Championship

CUT = missed the halfway cut
"T" indicates a tie for a place
C = Canceled after the first round due to the COVID-19 pandemic

Results in World Golf Championships
Results not in chronological order before 2015.

1Cancelled due to COVID-19 pandemic

QF, R16, R32, R64 = Round in which player lost in match play
NT = No tournament
"T" = Tied

U.S. national team appearances
Professional
World Cup: 2011 (winners)
Presidents Cup: 2019 (winners)

See also
2008 PGA Tour Qualifying School graduates
2010 PGA Tour Qualifying School graduates

Notes

References

External links

Profile on Kansas University's athletic site

American male golfers
PGA Tour golfers
Winners of men's major golf championships
Golfers from Kansas
Washburn Ichabods men's basketball players
Kansas Jayhawks men's golfers
Sportspeople from Topeka, Kansas
Golfers from Orlando, Florida
People from Shawnee, Kansas
Sportspeople from Delray Beach, Florida
1984 births
Living people